The 1848 Massachusetts gubernatorial election was held on November 13, 1848.

Incumbent Whig Governor George N. Briggs defeated Free Soil nominee Stephen C. Phillips and Democratic nominee Caleb Cushing.

Since no candidate received a majority in the popular vote, Briggs was elected by the Massachusetts General Court per the state constitution.

Democratic nomination
The Democratic convention was held on September 6, 1848 at Worcester City Hall.

Results

Whig nomination
The Whig convention was held on September 13, 1848 at Worcester. Governor George N. Briggs and Lieutenant Governor John Reed Jr. were re-nominated by acclamation.

General election

Candidates
George N. Briggs, Whig, incumbent Governor
Stephen C. Phillips, Free Soil, former U.S. Representative, former Mayor ofSalem, Massachusetts
Caleb Cushing, Democratic, former U.S. Representative, former United States Minister to China
Frederick Robinson, Independent Democrat, warden of the Massachusetts State Prison, former President of the Massachusetts Senate

Results

Legislative election
As no candidate received a majority of the vote, the Massachusetts General Court was required to decide the election. Under Article III of the Constitution of Massachusetts, the House of Representatives chose two candidates from the top four vote-getters, the Senate electing the Governor from the House's choice.

The legislative election was held on January 8, 1849.

References

1848
Massachusetts
Gubernatorial